These are the results of the November 6, 2005, municipal elections in Quebec for the region of Centre-du-Québec. Some mayors and councillors were elected without opposition from October 14, 2005.

Aston-Jonction
All elected without opposition.
 Councillor 3: Fabrice Poirier sr
 Councillor 4: Monique Doucet
 Councillor 5: Jocelyne Alain
 Councillor 6: Sébastien Labonté

Baie-du-Febvre
All elected without opposition.
 Mayor: Claude Biron
 Councillor 1: Lina Beaudoin
 Councillor 2: Michel Benoit
 Councillor 4: René Lemire
 Councillor 5: Raymond Lyonnais
 Councillor 6: Denis Beausoleil

Bécancour
Electors: 8 955
Voters: 4 459 (50%)
Councillors 1, 3 and 5 were elected without opposition.
 Mayor: Maurice Richard
 Councillor 1: Fernand Croteau
 Councillor 2: Guy Richard
 Councillor 3: Louise Labbée
 Councillor 4: Mario Gagné
 Councillor 5: Gaétane Désilets
 Councillor 6: Alain Lévesque

Chester-Est
All elected without opposition.
 Mayor: Lionel Fréchette
 Councillor 1: Pierre Goulet
 Councillor 2: Sonia Rondeau
 Councillor 3: Sylvain Thibault
 Councillor 4: Christine Boilard
 Councillor 5: Éric Allaire
 Councillor 6: John Pothitos

Chesterville
Electors: 697
Voters: 487 (70%)
Councillors 1, 3, 4 and 5 were elected without opposition.
 Mayor: Luc Fleury
 Councillor 1: Jean Gauthier
 Councillor 2: Rémi Beaudoin
 Councillor 3: Renaud Monfette
 Councillor 4: Chantal Desharnais
 Councillor 5: Alain Paris
 Councillor 6: Daniel Bédard

Daveluyville
Mayor and councillors 1, 2, 4, 5 and 6 were elected without opposition.
 Mayor: Normand Beaudoin
 Councillor 1: François Robidoux
 Councillor 2: Jacques Labbé
 Councillor 3: Marc Dorion
 Councillor 4: Roland A. Séguin
 Councillor 5: Edmond Grignon
 Councillor 6: Fernand Rochefort

Deschaillons-sur-Saint-Laurent
All elected without opposition.
 Mayor: Christian Baril
 Councillor 1: Janine M. Demers
 Councillor 2: Jean-Robert Dufour
 Councillor 3: Ulrich Binggeli
 Councillor 4: Daniel Lahaie
 Councillor 5: Daniel Demers
 Councillor 6: Raymond Gagnon

Drummondville
Mayor and councillor 2 were elected without opposition.
 Mayor: Francine Ruest-Jutras
 Councillor 1: Mario Jacques
 Councillor 2: Roberto Léveillée
 Councillor 3: Jocelyn Gagné
 Councillor 4: Jean Shooner
 Councillor 5: Gilles Fontaine
 Councillor 6: Christian Tourigny
 Councillor 7: Alain Martel
 Councillor 8: Yves Grondin
 Councillor 9: Pierre-Yvan Aubé
 Councillor 10: Denise Picotin
 Councillor 11: Denis Chamberland
 Councillor 12: Pierre Levasseur

Durham-Sud
All elected without opposition.
 Mayor: Michel Noël
 Councillor 1: Pierre Noël
 Councillor 2: Hilarius Peter
 Councillor 3: Jean-Marie Belcourt
 Councillor 4: Adrien Larivière
 Councillor 5: Cécile C. Thomas
 Councillor 6: Laurent Goupil

Fortierville
Mayor and councillors 2, 3, 5 and 6 were elected without opposition.
 Mayor: Colette Cloutier
 Councillor 1: Renald Lemay
 Councillor 2: Denis Bélanger
 Councillor 3: Pascal Gagnon
 Councillor 4: Sharon Butler
 Councillor 5: Serge Grimard
 Councillor 6: Alain Lemay

Grand-Saint-Esprit
All elected without opposition.
 Mayor: Julien 'ti_jule' Boudreault
 Councillor 1: Gilles Chabot
 Councillor 2: Philippe Gras
 Councillor 3: Pascal Desrochers
 Councillor 4: Huguette Fleurent
 Councillor 5: Mario Provencher
 Councillor 6: Laurier Marcotte

Ham-Nord
All elected without opposition.
 Mayor: François Marcotte
 Councillor 1: Irénée Giguère
 Councillor 2: Jean-Claude Royer
 Councillor 3: Simonne Cadorette
 Councillor 4: Denis Couture
 Councillor 5: Edgar Morin
 Councillor 6: Rémi Beauchesne

Inverness
Electors: 699
Voters: 478 (68%)
All councillors were elected without opposition.
 Mayor: Gilles St-Pierre
 Councillor 1: Martin Dumas
 Councillor 2: François Parent
 Councillor 3: Bernard Dion
 Councillor 4: Martin Guimond
 Councillor 5: Michel Berthiaume
 Councillor 6: Cindy White

Kingsey Falls
Electors: 1 483
Voters: 788 (53%)
Councillors 1, 2, 3 and 6 were elected without opposition.
 Mayor: Micheline Pinard-Lampron
 Councillor 1: Christian Tisluck
 Councillor 2: Christian Côté
 Councillor 3: Alain Ducharme
 Councillor 4: Christian Drouin
 Councillor 5: Jean-Pierre Fredette
 Councillor 6: Sylvain Fortier

La Visitation-de-Yamaska
All elected without opposition.
 Mayor: Sylvain Laplante
 Councillor 1: Georges-Émile Jutras
 Councillor 2: Pascal Lemire
 Councillor 3: Sylvain Jutras
 Councillor 4: Sylvain Jutras
 Councillor 5: Pierre Bourassa
 Councillor 6: Réjean Maillette

Laurierville
Electors: 1 180
Voters: 776 (66%)
Councillors 2, 5 and 6 were elected without opposition.
 Mayor: Martin Gingras
 Councillor 1: Pierrette Payeur
 Councillor 2: Mario Lessard
 Councillor 3: Daniel Fortin
 Councillor 4: Charles-Omer Brassard
 Councillor 5: Marie-Thérèse Gervais
 Councillor 6: Marc Simoneau

L'Avenir
Electors: 1 072
Voters: 652 (61%)
Councillors 4 and 6 were elected without opposition.
 Mayor: François Demanche
 Councillor 1: Claudette Lavallée
 Councillor 2: André R. Champagne
 Councillor 3: Jocelyn Boisjoli
 Councillor 4: Jean Parenteau
 Councillor 5: Louis Roy
 Councillor 6: Alain Bahl

Lefebvre
All elected without opposition.
 Mayor: Claude Bahl
 Councillor 1: Jocelyn Verrier
 Councillor 2: Carmen Ducharme
 Councillor 3: Rénald Saillant
 Councillor 4: Lina Lacharité
 Councillor 5: Raynald Tessier
 Councillor 6: François Parenteau

Lemieux
All elected without opposition.
 Mayor: Jean-Louis Bélisle
 Councillor 1: Josef Mathis
 Councillor 2: Vacancy
 Councillor 3: Léo-Paul Côté
 Councillor 4: Céleste Simard
 Councillor 5: Jean Blanchette
 Councillor 6: Martin Blanchette

Lyster
Mayor and councillors 1 and 2 were elected without opposition.
 Mayor: Marcel Beaudoin
 Councillor 1: Sylvain Labrecque
 Councillor 2: Viateur Fournier
 Councillor 3: Normand Raby
 Councillor 4: Yves Boissonneault
 Councillor 5: Alain Moisan
 Councillor 6: David Boissonneault

Maddington
All elected without opposition.
 Mayor: Normand Soucy
 Councillor 1: Bernard Philipps
 Councillor 2: Ghislain Brulé
 Councillor 3: Jean-Yves Rochefort
 Councillor 4: Gaétan Légaré
 Councillor 5: François Mercier
 Councillor 6: André Rheault

Manseau
All elected without opposition.
Mayor: Guy St-Pierre
 Councillor 1: Christian Légaré
 Councillor 2: Alain Boucher
 Councillor 3: Marc Lavertue
 Councillor 4: Sylvie Corriveau
 Councillor 5: Nicole Vachon
 Councillor 6: Michel Croteau

Nicolet
Electors: 6 339
Voters: 3 236 (51%)
Councillors 3 and 5 were elected without opposition.
 Mayor: Alain Drouin
 Councillor 1: Mario Lemire
 Councillor 2: Michel Paradis
 Councillor 3: Jean Rousseau
 Councillor 4: Stéphane Biron
 Councillor 5: Sylvie Côté
 Councillor 6: Hélène Langis

Norbertville
All elected without opposition.
 Mayor: Richard Gamache
 Councillor 1: Jules Roy
 Councillor 2: Linda Lecours
 Councillor 3: Paul-Émile Boisvert
 Councillor 4: Sylvie Leblanc
 Councillor 5: Alexandre Gardner
 Councillor 6: Christian Beaudet

Notre-Dame-de-Ham
Electors: 348
Voters: 246 (71%)
Councillors 2, 4, 5 and 6 were elected without opposition.
 Mayor: Gilles Pépin
 Councillor 1: Pauline Leblond
 Councillor 2: Jacques Ramsay
 Councillor 3: Michel Roy
 Councillor 4: Guy Hudon
 Councillor 5: Nicole Côté
 Councillor 6: Marylène Daigneault

Notre-Dame-de-Lourdes
Electors: 589
Voters: 472 (80%)
All councillors were elected without opposition.
 Mayor: Jocelyn Bédard
 Councillor 1: Donald Laliberté
 Councillor 2: Chantal Tanguay
 Councillor 3: Michel Comeau
 Councillor 4: Francine Turmel
 Councillor 5: Normand Nault
 Councillor 6: Yves Payette

Notre-Dame-du-Bon-Conseil

Notre-Dame-du-Bon-Conseil (parish)
Electors: 808
Voters: 535 (66%)
Councillors 2 and 4 were elected without opposition.
 Mayor: Michel Bourgeois
 Councillor 1: Daniel Dufort
 Councillor 2: Sylvie Houle Lambert
 Councillor 3: Stéphane Dionne
 Councillor 4: Hélène C. Lemaire
 Councillor 5: Maureen Landry
 Councillor 6: Marie-Lyne Landry

Notre-Dame-du-Bon-Conseil (village)
Electors: 1 078
Voters: 550 (51%)
All councillors were elected without opposition.
 Mayor: Yvon Lampron
 Councillor 1: Louise Lambert-Leblanc
 Councillor 2: Yvon Grenier
 Councillor 3: André Caya
 Councillor 4: Rénald Lemire
 Councillor 5: Jean-Paul Fleurant
 Councillor 6: Gilles Marin

Parisville
All elected without opposition.
 Mayor: Roland Laquerre
 Councillor 1: Marie-Josée Michel
 Councillor 2: Denis Paris
 Councillor 3: Normand Pérusse
 Councillor 4: Stéphane Boutin
 Councillor 5: Maurice Grimard
 Councillor 6: Véronique Bélanger

Pierreville
Electors: 1 941
Voters: 1 345 (69%)
Councillors 5 and 6 were elected without opposition.
 Mayor: André Descôteaux
 Councillor 1: Jean-Guy Gamelin
 Councillor 2: Pierre Levasseur
 Councillor 3: Mélanie Fontaine
 Councillor 4: Sylvain Traversy
 Councillor 5: Guy Côté
 Councillor 6: Jean-Luc Vallières

Plessisville

Plessisville (parish)
Mayor and councillors 1, 2, 3, 4 and 6 were elected without opposition.
 Mayor: Berthe Marcoux
 Councillor 1: Jean-Noël St-Amand
 Councillor 2: Sylvie Tremblay
 Councillor 3: Noël Bergeron
 Councillor 4: Bruno Vigneault
 Councillor 5: Jean-Noël Bergeron
 Councillor 6: Normand Bourque

Plessisville (city)
Electors: 5 323
Voters: 2 825 (53%)
Councillors 4, 5 and 6 were elected without opposition.
 Mayor: Jacques Martineau
 Councillor 1: Michel Gosselin
 Councillor 2: Gaétan Blier
 Councillor 3: Jean-François Labbé
 Councillor 4: Sonia Gosselin
 Councillor 5: Bernardin Ruel
 Councillor 6: Jacques Vallée

Princeville
Mayor and councillors 1, 2, 3, 4 and 6 were elected without opposition.
 Mayor: Gilles Fortier
 Councillor 1: Monique Carré
 Councillor 2: Martin Sévégny
 Councillor 3: Serge Bizier
 Councillor 4: Fernand Ruel
 Councillor 5: André Bergeron
 Councillor 6: Claude Côté

Saint-Albert
All elected without opposition.
 Mayor: Alain St-Pierre
 Councillor 1: Denis Giguère
 Councillor 2: Dominique Poulin
 Councillor 3: Colette Gagnon
 Councillor 4: Michel Ducharme
 Councillor 5: Justin Chabot
 Councillor 6: Denis Gauthier

Saint-Bonaventure
All elected without opposition.
 Mayor: Félicien Cardin
 Councillor 1: André Lachapelle
 Councillor 2: René Des Serres
 Councillor 3: Michel Lemaire
 Councillor 4: Jean Parenteau
 Councillor 5: Louis Pépin
 Councillor 6: Guy Lavoie

Saint-Célestin

Saint-Célestin (municipality)
Mayor and councillors 1, 3, 4 and 6 were elected without opposition.
 Mayor: Maurice Morin
 Councillor 1: René Bourgeois
 Councillor 2: René Poirier
 Councillor 3: Michel Parenteau
 Councillor 4: Michael Bergeron
 Councillor 5: André Forest
 Councillor 6: Francine Bisaillon

Saint-Célestin (village)
All elected without opposition.
 Mayor: Raymond Noel
 Councillor 1: Alain Boudreault
 Councillor 2: Yvon Parenteau
 Councillor 3: Denis Croteau
 Councillor 4: Marc Arseneault
 Councillor 5: Claude Vézina
 Councillor 6: Jean-Yves Hébert

Saint-Christophe-d'Arthabaska
Electors: 1 993
Voters: 790 (40%)
All councillors were elected without opposition.
 Mayor: Clémence Le May
 Councillor 1: Marcel Denault
 Councillor 2: Marcel Marchand
 Councillor 3: Hugues Girouard
 Councillor 4: Michel Larochelle
 Councillor 5: Josée Veillette
 Councillor 6: Yvan Levasseur

Saint-Cyrille-de-Wendover
Mayor and councillors 1, 2 and 6 were elected without opposition.
 Mayor: Jean-Guy Bergeron
 Councillor 1: Pierre Lavigne
 Councillor 2: Gilles Vallières
 Councillor 3: Steve Lambert
 Councillor 4: Daniel Lafond
 Councillor 5: Éric Cardinal
 Councillor 6: Sylvain Jacques

Sainte-Anne-du-Sault
Mayor and councillors 2, 3, 4 and 5 were elected without opposition.
 Mayor: Jean-Claude Bourassa
 Councillor 1: Jacqueline Dorion
 Councillor 2: Sara Mayrand Dubois
 Councillor 3: Ghyslain Noël
 Councillor 4: Denis Bergeron
 Councillor 5: Roland Ayotte
 Councillor 6: Lyne Rheault

Sainte-Brigitte-des-Saults
All elected without opposition.
 Mayor: Jean-Guy Hébert
 Councillor 1: Rose-Marie Boûten
 Councillor 2: Nathalie Roy
 Councillor 3: Claude Duchesneau
 Councillor 4: Roland Lépine
 Councillor 5: Jocelyne Guilbault
 Councillor 6: Marco Richard

Sainte-Cécile-de-Lévrard
Mayor and councillors 1, 2, 3, 4 and 5 were elected without opposition.
 Mayor: Pierre Carignan
 Councillor 1: Claude Lambert
 Councillor 2: Colette Demers
 Councillor 3: Annie Blanchet
 Councillor 4: Michel Deshaies
 Councillor 5: Steve Lavigne
 Councillor 6: Serge Nault

Sainte-Clotilde-de-Horton
Mayor and councillors 1, 2, 4, 5 and 6 were elected without opposition.
 Mayor: Marie Désilets
 Councillor 1: Patrice Pinard
 Councillor 2: Patricia Blais
 Councillor 3: Simon Boucher
 Councillor 4: Léo Benoit
 Councillor 5: François Biron
 Councillor 6: Marie-Josée Fréchette

Saint-Edmond-de-Grantham
Electors: 499
Voters: 362 (73%)
Councillors 3 and 6 were elected without opposition.
 Mayor: Marie-Andrée Auger
 Councillor 1: Jean-Louis Duff
 Councillor 2: Réal Carpentier
 Councillor 3: Claire G. St-Sauveur
 Councillor 4: Micheline Blanchard
 Councillor 5: Yves Charpentier
 Councillor 6: Luc Lafleur

Sainte-Élisabeth-de-Warwick
All elected without opposition.
 Mayor: Christian Martel
 Councillor 1: Pierre-Paul Leblanc
 Councillor 2: Marie-France Dumas
 Councillor 3: Jeannine Moisan
 Councillor 4: Pierre Hébert
 Councillor 5: Gérard Beauchesne
 Councillor 6: André Bougie

Sainte-Eulalie
Mayor and councillors 1, 2, 3, 5 and 6 were elected without opposition.
 Mayor: Jacques Tassé
 Councillor 1: Paul-Émile Prince
 Councillor 2: Ghislain Hélie
 Councillor 3: Sylvain Beaumier
 Councillor 4: André Demers
 Councillor 5: Gilbert Rochefort
 Councillor 6: Denise Chagnon

Sainte-Françoise
Mayor and councillors 1, 2, 3, 4 and 6 were elected without opposition.
 Mayor: Mario Lyonnais
 Councillor 1: Sylvain Pelletier
 Councillor 2: Martin Beaulac
 Councillor 3: Gilles Tousignant
 Councillor 4: Daniel Paré
 Councillor 5: Claude Gagnon
 Councillor 6: Alain Bédard

Saint-Elphège
All elected without opposition.
 Mayor: Gérard Côté
 Councillor 1: Marcel Paquette
 Councillor 2: Jacques Roy
 Councillor 3: Victor Laforce
 Councillor 4: Claude Précourt
 Councillor 5: Denis Paquet
 Councillor 6: Mario Lefebvre

Sainte-Marie-de-Blandford
Mayor and councillors 1, 2, 4, 5 and 6 were elected without opposition.
 Mayor: Ginette Deshaies
 Councillor 1: Paul Cayouette
 Councillor 2: Michel Beauchesne
 Councillor 3: Martin Toutant
 Councillor 4: Daniel Beauchesne
 Councillor 5: Roger Millette
 Councillor 6: Michel Champagne

Sainte-Monique
All elected without opposition.
 Mayor: Denis Jutras
 Councillor 1: Michael Beauchemin
 Councillor 2: Bertrand Guévin
 Councillor 3: Hélène Bussard-Doutaz
 Councillor 4: André Courchesne
 Councillor 5: Bertrand Rousseau
 Councillor 6: Sylvie Marcotte

Sainte-Perpétue
All elected without opposition.
 Mayor: Line Théroux
 Councillor 1: Claudette Rochette
 Councillor 2: Jean-Guy Lambert
 Councillor 3: Jean-Clément Allard
 Councillor 4: Carmen Arseneault
 Councillor 5: Jacques Raîche
 Councillor 6: Michel Lafond

Sainte-Séraphine
All elected without opposition.
 Mayor: Alphonse Lampron
 Councillor 1: Claire Lyonnais
 Councillor 2: Jacques Méthot
 Councillor 3: Isabelle Deschamps
 Councillor 4: Claude Lampron
 Councillor 5: Mathieu Allard
 Councillor 6: Daniel Coupal

Sainte-Sophie-de-Lévrard
Electors: 626
Voters: 449 (72%)
Councillors 1, 2, 3, 4 and 5 were elected without opposition.
 Mayor: Jean-Guy Beaudet
 Councillor 1: Serge Turmel
 Councillor 2: Sonia Laquerre
 Councillor 3: Daniel Désilets
 Councillor 4: Roger Neault
 Councillor 5: André Montreuil
 Councillor 6: Richard Forget

Sainte-Sophie-d'Halifax
Electors: 463
Voters: 410 (89%)
Councillors 2, 3, 4, 5 and 6 were elected without opposition.
 Mayor: Marc Nadeau
 Councillor 1: Francine Charland
 Councillor 2: Sylvain Laganière
 Councillor 3: Martin Le Moine
 Councillor 4: Gaétan Labonté
 Councillor 5: Gaston Perreault
 Councillor 6: Bruno Lamontagne

Saint-Eugène
All elected without opposition.
 Mayor: Gilles Watier
 Councillor 1: Michel Bouthot
 Councillor 2: Gilles Beauregard
 Councillor 3: Gilles Lamontagne
 Councillor 4: Laurent Lafond
 Councillor 5: Albert Lacroix
 Councillor 6: Martin Beauregard

Saint-Félix-de-Kingsey
All elected without opposition.
 Mayor: Paul-Ernest Deslandes
 Councillor 1: Marcel Robidas
 Councillor 2: Douglas Béard
 Councillor 3: Ginette Bouchard
 Councillor 4: Martin Chainey
 Councillor 5: Réal Cormier
 Councillor 6: Joëlle Cardonne

Saint-Ferdinand
Mayor and councillors 1, 4 and 6 were elected without opposition.
 Mayor: Donald Langlois
 Councillor 1: Clermont Tardif
 Councillor 2: Paulo Asselin
 Councillor 3: Alain Ruel
 Councillor 4: Yvan Langlois
 Councillor 5: Bernard Barlow
 Councillor 6: Guylaine Blondeau

Saint-François-du-Lac
Electors: 1 658
Voters: 986 (59%)
All councillors were elected without opposition.
 Mayor: Georgette Critchley-Michon
 Councillor 1: Jean-Louis Lambert
 Councillor 2: Jean Duhaime
 Councillor 3: Yves Plante
 Councillor 4: Daniel Labbé
 Councillor 5: Réjean Gamelin
 Councillor 6: Yvan L'Heureux

Saint-Germain-de-Grantham
Mayor and councillors 1 and 4 were elected without opposition.
 Mayor: Yvon Nault
 Councillor 1: Denis Boucher
 Councillor 2: Gilles Perreault
 Councillor 3: Jocelyn Leblanc
 Councillor 4: Simon Coderre
 Councillor 5: Roger Fortin
 Councillor 6: Pierre Cardin

Saint-Guillaume
Electors: 1 190
Voters: 666 (56%)
Councillors 1 and 3 were elected without opposition.
 Mayor: Jean-Pierre Vallée
 Councillor 1: Yvon Doyon
 Councillor 2: Alain Laprade
 Councillor 3: Nicole Joyal Laforce
 Councillor 4: Claude Lapolice
 Councillor 5: Jocelyn Chamberland
 Councillor 6: Roger Arpin

Saint-Léonard-d'Aston
Mayor and councillors 1, 3 and 6 were elected without opposition.
 Mayor: Laval Simard
 Councillor 1: René Genest
 Councillor 2: Marthe Proulx
 Councillor 3: André Nadeau
 Councillor 4: Yolande Morissette
 Councillor 5: Guy Carter
 Councillor 6: Jean-Claude Laplante

Saint-Louis-de-Blandford
Electors: 785
Voters: 492 (63%)
 Mayor: Gilles Marchand
 Councillor 1: Marie Bussières Bieler
 Councillor 2: Carole Fontaine
 Councillor 3: Sylvie Gélinas
 Councillor 4: Christian Morissette
 Councillor 5: Luc Pelletier
 Councillor 6: Marie-Soleil Anger

Saint-Lucien
Electors: 1 221
Voters: 586 (48%)
Councillors 2 and 5 were elected without opposition.
 Mayor: Robin Doré
 Councillor 1: Denis Forest
 Councillor 2: François Bernard
 Councillor 3: Sylvie Lampron
 Councillor 4: Claude Houle
 Councillor 5: Jean-Pierre Desrochers
 Councillor 6: Ghislaine Béliveau-Lampron

Saint-Majorique-de-Grantham
Electors: 867
Voters: 617 (71%)
 Mayor: Pierre Delcourt
 Councillor 1: André Parenteau
 Councillor 2: Gilles Turner
 Councillor 3: Sylvain Paul
 Councillor 4: Daniel Courchesne
 Councillor 5: Estelle Lemire-Demers
 Councillor 6: Réjean Rodier

Saint-Norbert-d'Arthabaska
All elected without opposition.
 Mayor: Ghislain Caouette
 Councillor 1: Jacques Dion
 Councillor 2: Louise Caouette
 Councillor 3: Daniel Moreau
 Councillor 4: Étienne Pelchat
 Councillor 5: Sonia Savoie
 Councillor 6: Alain Tourigny

Saint-Pie-de-Guire
Mayor and councillors 1, 2, 3, 4 and 6 were elected without opposition.
 Mayor: Benoît Bourque
 Councillor 1: Gilles Niquette
 Councillor 2: Jocelyn Letendre
 Councillor 3: Rose-Hélène Pépin
 Councillor 4: André Huet
 Councillor 5: Georges Martel
 Councillor 6: Claude Desmarais

Saint-Pierre-Baptiste
Electors: 502
Voters: 364 (73%)
All councillors were elected without opposition.
 Mayor: Bertrand Fortier
 Councillor 1: Paul Fortier
 Councillor 2: Fabien Fillion
 Councillor 3: Martial Roy
 Councillor 4: Daniel Fortier
 Councillor 5: Nathalie Gouin
 Councillor 6: Ronald Fortier

Saint-Pierre-les-Becquets
Mayor and councillors 1, 3, 4, 5 and 6 were elected without opposition.
 Mayor: Raymond Dion
 Councillor 1: Claude Durand
 Councillor 2: Francine Bergeron
 Councillor 3: Gérard Cossette
 Councillor 4: Marie-France Poirier
 Councillor 5: Marcel Fleurant
 Councillor 6: Louise Lemay

Saint-Rémi-de-Tingwick
Electors: 415
Voters: 282 (68%)
Councillors 1, 2, 3, 4 and 6 were elected without opposition.
 Mayor: Jacques Fréchette
 Councillor 1: Luc Pellerin
 Councillor 2: Réjeanne Vallières
 Councillor 3: Alain Dubois
 Councillor 4: Jean-Pierre Sinotte
 Councillor 5: Yves Langlois
 Councillor 6: David Bélanger

Saint-Rosaire
All elected without opposition.
 Mayor: Yvan Godin
 Councillor 1: Harold Poisson
 Councillor 2: Serge Côté
 Councillor 3: Roland Allard
 Councillor 4: Johanne Gagnon
 Councillor 5: François Hamel
 Councillor 6: Marc Lavigne

Saint-Samuel
All elected without opposition.
 Mayor: René Mongrain
 Councillor 1: Pierrette Doucet
 Councillor 2: Claude Desrochers
 Councillor 3: Donnald Massé
 Councillor 4: Laurent Ratté
 Councillor 5: Nancy Bergeron
 Councillor 6: René Bergeron

Saints-Martyrs-Canadiens
Mayor and councillors 2, 4, 5 and 6 were elected without opposition.
 Mayor: André Henri
 Councillor 1: Jean-Marie Savard
 Councillor 2: Laurier St-Onge
 Councillor 3: Daniel Yergeau
 Councillor 4: Pierre Béliveau
 Councillor 5: Danielle Carignan
 Councillor 6: Martine Desloges

Saint-Sylvère
All elected without opposition.
 Mayor: Claude Beaudoin
 Councillor 1: Monique Mayrand
 Councillor 2: Roger Faucher
 Councillor 3: Yves Jacques
 Councillor 4: Pierre Béliveau
 Councillor 5: Lise Ouellette
 Councillor 6: Bruno Hébert

Saint-Valère
All elected without opposition.
 Mayor: Thérèse Domingue
 Councillor 1: Aline Grandmont
 Councillor 2: Noël Bélanger
 Councillor 3: Claude Bourassa
 Councillor 4: Réal Boissonneault
 Councillor 5: Louis Hébert
 Councillor 6: André Normand

Saint-Wenceslas
Mayor and councillors 1, 2, 3, 5 and 6 were elected without opposition.
 Mayor: Raymond Bilodeau
 Councillor 1: Jacinthe Désilets
 Councillor 2: Marcel Deschênes
 Councillor 3: Claude Champoux
 Councillor 4: Josée Veillette
 Councillor 5: Denise Descôteaux
 Councillor 6: Lorraine Jacques Lapointe

Saint-Zéphirin-de-Courval
All elected without opposition.
 Mayor: Raymond Lemaire
 Councillor 1: Yvan Fréchette
 Councillor 2: Pierre Viau
 Councillor 3: Sylvain Desgranges
 Councillor 4: Annie Pellerin
 Councillor 5: Roger Côté
 Councillor 6: Mathieu Lemire

Tingwick
All elected without opposition.
 Mayor: Paul-Émile Simoneau
 Councillor 1: Benoît Lambert
 Councillor 2: Marjolaine Vaudreuil-Michaud
 Councillor 3: André Bourassa
 Councillor 4: Yves Roux
 Councillor 5: Gaétan Hinse
 Councillor 6: Michel Brochu

Victoriaville
Mayor and councillors 5, 6, 7, 9 and 10 were elected without opposition.
 Mayor: Roger Richard
 Councillor 1: Bertrand Lambert
 Councillor 2: Jacques Gagnon
 Councillor 3: Jacques Nadeau
 Councillor 4: Alexandre Côté
 Councillor 5: France Auger
 Councillor 6: Éric Lefebvre
 Councillor 7: Michel Allard
 Councillor 8: Denis Morin
 Councillor 9: Donald Dumont
 Councillor 10: Christian Lettre

Villeroy
Mayor and councillors 1, 2, 3, 5 and 6 were elected without opposition.
 Mayor: Michel Poisson
 Councillor 1: Réjean Perron
 Councillor 2: Yvan Paquet
 Councillor 3: François Gingras
 Councillor 4: Lise Mélançon
 Councillor 5: Éric Chartier
 Councillor 6: Daniel Baker

Warwick
Mayor and councillors 2, 4, 5 and 6 were elected without opposition.
 Mayor: Claude Desrochers
 Councillor 1: France Douville
 Councillor 2: Rock Robitaille
 Councillor 3: Stéphane Hamel
 Councillor 4: Pascal Lambert
 Councillor 5: Louis Mari Champagne
 Councillor 6: Pierrette Lauzière

Wickham
Electors: 1 848
Voters: 955 (52%)
Councillor 5 was elected without opposition.
 Mayor: Éric Béchard
 Councillor 1: Guylaine Bluteau
 Councillor 2: Chantal Giroux
 Councillor 3: Dany Bouchard
 Councillor 4: Daniel Fafard
 Councillor 5: Carole Côté
 Councillor 6: Guy Leroux

2005 Quebec municipal elections
Centre-du-Québec